Mario González Gutiérrez (born 25 February 1996) is a Spanish professional footballer who plays for Belgian club Oud-Heverlee Leuven on loan from S.C. Braga. Mainly a forward, he can also play as a right winger.

Club career
Born in Villarcayo de Merindad de Castilla la Vieja, Province of Burgos, Castile and León, González joined Villarreal CF's youth system in 2012. On 30 August 2014 he made his senior debut for the C team, starting in a 1–3 home loss against CD Castellón in the Tercera División.

González scored his first senior goal on 5 October 2014, the third in a 4–0 home victory over FC Jove Español. He added a brace against Orihuela CF on 14 December, two more against UD Benigànim and Ontinyent CF in the following campaign, and a hat-trick in a 6–1 rout of CD Acero on 28 November 2015.

González made his first-team debut on 17 August 2016, coming on as a second-half substitute for Rafael Santos Borré in a 1–2 home loss to AS Monaco FC in the play-off round of the UEFA Champions League. His first match in La Liga was three days later, when he replaced Alexandre Pato in the 1–1 draw at Granada CF. 

In July 2019, González was loaned to French Ligue 2 club Clermont Foot. A year later, after exercising an option in his contract, he returned to Villarreal on a two-year deal. 

González went on loan to Portugal's C.D. Tondela in the summer of 2020. He scored a career-best 15 times during his spell (ranking fourth in the Primeira Liga individual charts for the season), including three in 12 minutes in a 3–2 away win against Moreirense FC.

On 1 July 2021, González signed a four-year contract at S.C. Braga of the same country and league. The following 31 January, he returned to his home country after agreeing to a six-month loan with CD Tenerife.

Honours
Individual
Primeira Liga Forward of the Month: April 2021

References

External links

1996 births
Living people
Sportspeople from the Province of Burgos
Spanish footballers
Footballers from Castile and León
Association football wingers
Association football forwards
La Liga players
Segunda División players
Segunda División B players
Tercera División players
Villarreal CF C players
Villarreal CF B players
Villarreal CF players
CD Tenerife players
Ligue 2 players
Clermont Foot players
Primeira Liga players
C.D. Tondela players
S.C. Braga players
Belgian Pro League players
Oud-Heverlee Leuven players
Spain youth international footballers
Spanish expatriate footballers
Expatriate footballers in France
Expatriate footballers in Portugal
Expatriate footballers in Belgium
Spanish expatriate sportspeople in France
Spanish expatriate sportspeople in Portugal
Spanish expatriate sportspeople in Belgium